Paraburkholderia denitrificans is a gram-negative, bacterium from the genus Paraburkholderia and the family Burkholderiaceae which was isolated from wet forest soil on the island of Liancourt Rocks. Paraburkholderia denitrificans has the ability to reduced nitrate to nitrogen gas.

References

denitrificans
Bacteria described in 2013